Marie Ann-Charlotte Dacke (born 1973) is a professor in the Lund Vision Group at Lund University in Sweden. She received an Ig Nobel Prize in 2013 for her work on the navigation system of dung beetles. She is also a panel member on the Swedish TV show Studio Natur, and was named best science communicator in Sweden during the 2012 Forskar Grand Prix.

Early life and career 
Dacke went to high school in Landskrona. She completed her Ph.D. at Lund University in 2003 under the supervision of Professor Dan-Eric Nilsson. She spent two years at the Centre for Visual Sciences at the Australian National University in Canberra as a postdoctoral fellow. She returned to Lund University in 2007, where she is now a Professor in Sensory Biology.

Dacke's research is focused on navigation in insects, in particular dung beetles. She is interested in their celestial compass, which is the use of the sky to guide navigation. In 2013 she, together with Marcus Byrne, Emily Baird, Clark Scholtz and Eric Warrant, received the Ig Nobel Prize in the joint astronomy and biology category for showing that nocturnal dung beetles can use the Milky Way as a compass; this research was published in Current Biology. In 2018 Dacke received funding from the European Research Council to expand on this work by studying brain activity in dung beetles as they perform their navigational behaviour.

Dacke was a member of the Young Academy of Sweden from 2011 to 2016.

Science communication 
In 2012 Dacke was named best science communicator in Sweden in a national competition called the Forskar Grand Prix (Science Grand Prix). She has been a panel member on the Swedish TV show Studio Natur since 2010. She performs in the Lund University Biology Show.

In 2012 Dacke was one of the scientists to appear in a series about research and researchers produced by the Swedish Foundation for Strategic Research and TV4.

In 2019 she gave the Royal Entomological Society's Verrall Lecture at the Natural History Museum, London, speaking about 'As the crow flies, and the beetle rolls: straight-line orientation from behaviour to neurons'.

In 2020 Dacke authored the book Trädgårdsdjur - myllret och mångfalden som växterna älskar (Roos&Tegnér) together with Låtta Skogh.

References 

1973 births
Living people
Swedish biologists
Swedish women biologists
Academic staff of Lund University
Members of the Royal Swedish Academy of Sciences